WOBO (88.7 FM) is a radio station broadcasting a Variety format. Licensed to Batavia, Ohio, United States, it serves the Cincinnati area. The station is currently owned by Educational Community Radio, Inc. It sometimes can come in as far south as Georgetown, Kentucky some 130 miles from Batavia, Ohio.

See also
List of community radio stations in the United States

External links
 

OBO
Community radio stations in the United States
Clermont County, Ohio